Hall County Courthouse in Memphis, Texas is a historic courthouse built in 1923.  It was listed on the National Register of Historic Places on October 1, 2008.

The four story, red brick building is a Classical Revival design with Beaux Arts influences. Each facade of the building features a two-story loggia with paired Corinthian columns.

See also

National Register of Historic Places listings in Hall County, Texas
Recorded Texas Historic Landmarks in Hall County
List of county courthouses in Texas

References

Courthouses on the National Register of Historic Places in Texas
Neoclassical architecture in Texas
Government buildings completed in 1923
County courthouses in Texas
Buildings and structures in Hall County, Texas
National Register of Historic Places in Hall County, Texas